"Tick Tock" is the third single taken from British R&B singer Lemar's third studio album The Truth About Love. The single was confirmed for release by music retailer HMV UK  and was released on 19 March 2007.

"Tick Tock" was Lemar's first release since "Got Me Saying Ooh" to only be released on one CD and, subsequently, became his first single to fail to make the top forty since the aforementioned "Got Me Saying Ooh", peaking at number forty-five in the UK singles chart.  The single version was the Kardinal Beats remix of the song, not the original album version.

A sample of Color Me Badd's  "I Wanna Sex You Up" is used in the Kardinal Beats remix.

Track listing
CD
 Tick Tock (Kardinal Beats Retro remix)
 Tick Tock (Future Cut remix)
 Tick Tock (Johnny Douglas remix)
 Tick Tock (album version)

Other versions

 Tick Tock (Staples Dance mix)

Charts

References

2007 singles
Lemar songs
Songs written by Lemar
Songs written by Harold Lilly (songwriter)
2006 songs